Ali Kadar is a Bangladesh Nationalist Party politician and the former Member of Parliament of Jessore-1.

Career
Kadar was elected to parliament from Jessore-1 as a Bangladesh Nationalist Party candidate in 2001. In March 2005, his son attacked on duty traffic officers in Manik Mia Avenue, Dhaka and injuring one officer, who required stitches. He served as the President of Benapole Customs Clearing and Forwarding Agents Association. He had previously served as the Benapole Union Parishad Chairman.

Death
Kader died on 30 June 2017 in New York City, United States.

References

Bangladesh Nationalist Party politicians
2017 deaths
8th Jatiya Sangsad members
People from Jessore District
Year of birth missing